PhillipCapital is an investment and wealth management firm, founded in 1975. It offers a wide range of products and services to individuals and institutional clients. It is headquartered in Singapore and operates in 15 countries including the financial hubs of Chicago, London, Tokyo, Hong Kong and Singapore. PhillipCapital has more than US$35 billion in assets under management. It manages retail and high net worth individuals, family offices, corporate and institutional customers.

History 
PhillipCapital was founded as a brokerage firm in 1975. In 1996, it introduced the first Internet trading platform in Singapore, POEMS.

In August 2014, PhillipCapital Group bought Hwang-DBS Commercial Bank in Cambodia for US$ 40 million and rebranded it as Phillip Bank. It is the third largest commercial bank branch network in Cambodia after the National Bank of Cambodia and Ministry of Commerce (MoC) approved the merger between Phillip Bank Plc and Kredit MFI in 2020.

In June 2020, the Australian arm of PhillipCapital Group was acquired by Sequoia Wealth Management.

In June 2022, PhillipCapital co-lead the financing round for Singapore-based fintech Helicap.

Awards and recognition 
 PhillipCapital was named Best Retail Broker at the Sias 18th Investors' Choice Awards by the Securities Investors Association (Singapore) in 2017.
 The company's founder Lim Hua Min was named Businessman of the Year at the 2018 Singapore Business Awards in April 2018.
 PhillipCapital UAE won the MENA Fund Manager Services Award in 2018.
 In September 2019, it won the Best Retail Broker Award at the Securities Investors' Association of Singapore's (Sias) Investors' Choice Awards 2019.

See also 

 Phillip Securities

References

External links 
 
Financial services companies established in 1975
Financial services companies of Singapore
Companies of Singapore